Thecaria is a genus of lichenized fungi in the family Graphidaceae.

References

Graphidaceae
Lichen genera
Ostropales genera
Taxa named by Antoine Laurent Apollinaire Fée